Shukri Lyutviev (born 22 November 1951) is a Bulgarian wrestler. He competed in the men's freestyle 90 kg at the 1976 Summer Olympics.

References

1951 births
Living people
Bulgarian male sport wrestlers
Olympic wrestlers of Bulgaria
Wrestlers at the 1976 Summer Olympics
People from Razgrad